Liopleurodon (meaning 'smooth-sided teeth') is an extinct genus of large, carnivorous marine reptile belonging to the Thalassophonea, a clade of short-necked pliosaurid plesiosaurs. Liopleurodon lived from the Callovian Stage of the Middle Jurassic to the  Kimmeridgian stage of the Late Jurassic Period (c. 166 to 155 mya). It was the apex predator of the Middle to Late Jurassic seas that covered Europe.

Discovery and species

Even before Liopleurodon was named, material likely belonging to it was described. In 1841, Hermann von Meyer named the species Thaumatosaurus oolithicus based on a fragmentary specimen consisting of partial teeth, skull elements, vertebrae, and ribs from deposits in Württemberg, Germany, possibly dating to the Oxfordian. However, this material is nondiagnostic, lacking distinguishing features. Johann Andreas Wagner published a description of a large plesiosaur tooth from Bavaria, Germany, in 1852, assigning it to a new species that he named Pliosaurus giganteus. However, in 1824, William Conybeare had named a species of Plesiosaurus, Plesiosaurus giganteus, and this species was later viewed as a synonym of either Pliosaurus brachydeirus or P. brachyspondylus by following authors. Since the name Pliosaurus giganteus had been used prior to Wagner's publication, Wagner's name is invalid due to preoccupation. In 1838, Hermann von Meyer applied the name Ischyrodon meriani to a large tooth from Oxfordian-aged rocks in Fricktal, Switzerland. This tooth lacks identifying characteristics, and therefore it is not clear what it belonged to, although Lambert Beverly Tarlo noted the possibility of it pertaining to Liopleurodon in 1960. A 2022 study by Daniel Madzia and colleagues noted that while the tooth likely came from Liopleurodon or something similar, there was too little information available to make a confident assignment, so they treated Ischyrodon as a nomen dubium. In 1860, Hermann Trautschold assigned the name Pliosaurus giganteus to a small tooth now thought to pertain to Liopleurodon. However, as the name Pliosaurus giganteus had already been used twice by this point, Trautschold's name is also invalid.

The genus name Liopleurodon was coined by Henri Émile Sauvage in 1873. Sauvage named three species which he assigned to this genus, each based on a single tooth. The third, discovered near Caen, France, was originally attributed to Poikilopleuron bucklandi by Eudes Deslongchamps. While the tooth could have come from the megalosaur, Sauvage considered this identity unsubstantiated, and assigned it to the species Liopleurodon bucklandi. Sauvage did not ascribe the genus to any particular group of reptiles in his descriptions.

However, in 1880, Sauvage synonymized Liopleurodon with Polyptychodon, noting that it was similar to this genus, but distinct from Plesiosaurus and Pliosaurus. In 1888, Richard Lydekker, after studying some teeth attributable to Liopleurodon ferox in the Leeds Collection, concluded that they were so similar to those of Pliosaurus that they should be placed in that genus. These teeth had been collected by Alfred Leeds from the Oxford Clay Formation, near Peterborough, England. In 1869, Harry Govier Seeley had applied the name Pliosaurus pachydeirus to a series of cervical (neck) vertebrae representing the first 17 in the neck from the Oxford Clay Formation near Great Gransden. Other than its large size, Seeley provided no distinguishing characteristics. Lydekker stated that this neck probably belonged to Pliosaurus ferox. W. Kiprijanoff named Thaumatosaurus mosquensis in 1883 based on remains including teeth, vertebrae, and limb bones from Oxfordian-aged rocks in the Moscow Basin of Russia; however, in 1889, Lydekker considered this species to be a probable junior synonym of P. ferox.

In 1905, John Frederick Blake described two teeth from Rushden, England, similar to those of other Liopleurodon ferox specimens, though from older strata than those from Peterborough. He noted that the teeth were quite different from those of Pliosaurus, while the bones were dissimilar to those of Polyptychodon. Since the species couldn't be assigned to either genus, he recommended reinstating the name Liopleurodon. After considering Liopleurodon to be a subgenus of Pliosaurus, N. Bogolubov also listed the two genera as distinct in 1912.

When Lydekker had first visited the collection of Alfred Leeds (known as the Leeds Collection), the only remains of Liopleurodon in his collection were teeth. However, since then, Alfred Leeds, as well as his brother Charles Edward Leeds, had collected many more specimens of Liopleurodon, including skulls and much of the postcranial skeleton. Charles William Andrews described the anatomy of the marine reptile specimens of the Leeds Collection acquired by the British Museum of Natural History in two volumes, the first published in 1910 and the second in 1913. He described the Liopleurodon specimens in the second volume, though considered them to belong to Pliosaurus.

Hermann Linder also described specimens of Liopleurodon ferox in 1913. One of these was a poorly preserved partial skeleton excavated from the Oxford Clay of Fletton, England, housed in Institut für Geowissenschaften, University of Tübingen. The skeleton was mounted and missing regions were restored with material from other Liopleurodon specimens. Like Andrews, Linder also considered L. ferox to be a species of Pliosaurus. Additionally, Linder described some skulls from Fletton housed at both the University of Tübingen and the State Museum of Natural History Stuttgart as specimens of P. grandis. Linder also assigned a nearly complete paddle to Pliosaurus sp. All of these specimens have since been assigned to Liopleurodon with varying degrees of confidence, though the skull Linder attributed to P. grandis that was housed in Stuttgart was destroyed during World War II. In 1934, Friedrich von Huene described a partial skeleton from Swabia, Germany. He also used Pliosaurus ferox instead of Liopleurodon ferox. In 1939, Alexandre Bigot used Pliosaurus ferox as well, assigning some teeth from France to this species.

Lambert Beverly Halstead, then known as Tarlo, published a review of Upper Jurassic pliosaurid taxonomy in 1960. He considered Liopleurodon to be distinct from Pliosaurus, noting major differences between the mandibles of the two genera. In addition to the type species L. ferox, Tarlo also considered Pliosaurus pachydeirus to be a valid species within Liopleurodon, L. pachydeirus, noting that the two species had differences in their teeth and cervical vertebrae. L. grossouvrei was not considered valid, though it was tentatively retained for teeth from the Kellaways Formation. In 1971, Halstead published another paper about Jurassic pliosaurids, this time focusing on Pliosaurus rossicus, a species he was formerly unwilling to consider valid, due to a lack of information. After reviewing its anatomy, he considered it valid, though assigned it to Liopleurodon instead, based on its short mandibular symphysis. Halstead also considered Pliosaurus macromerus, which he had previously considered to belong to its own genus, Stretosaurus, to instead be a species of Liopleurodon, despite its irregularly-shaped scapula (although this was later discovered to be an ilium). In 1992, Martill identified a fragmentary specimen belonging to a young adult individual, PETCM R.296, as cf. Liopleurodon sp.; the specimen was found to have at least 7 gastroliths in its stomach and soft tissues, although the specific features of the latter cannot be observed due to poor preservation.

In a 2001 dissertation, Leslie F. Noè argued that L. pachydeirus was not diagnostic, and that L. ferox was the only valid species of Liopleurodon. The teeth of mounted skeleton in Tübingen, which Tarlo had attributed to L. pachydeirus, showed distinctive characteristics of L. ferox, indicating that cervical vertebrae are not useful for differentiating species, as argued by David S. Brown in 1981. While Tarlo had considered differences in tooth morphology to be diagnostic, Noè instead considered it to be individual variation. Noè also removed L. macromerus and L. rossicus from the genus, citing differences in tooth shape and mandibular symphysis length. The former species was tentatively placed back in Pliosaurus, while the latter was thought to warrant a new genus.

Liopleurodon fossils have been found mainly in England and France. Fossil specimens that are contemporary (Callovian-Kimmeridgian) with those from England and France referrable to Liopleurodon are known from Germany. In 2013, Roger Benson and colleagues considered both "L." macromerus and "L." rossicus to belong to Pliosaurus. They also considered Liopleurodon to be restricted to the Middle Jurassic. In 2015, Jair Israel Barrientos-Lara and colleagues described two pliosaurid fossils found near the town of Tlaxiaco in Oaxaca, Mexico. These fossils were extracted from Kimmeridgian deposits in the Sabinal Formation, and one of them, the partial front end of a snout, was attributable to Liopleurodon, though the researchers considered the remains too fragmentary to provide a species-level identification. Liopleurodon grossouvrei, although synonymized with Pliosaurus andrewsi by most authors, was considered to potentially be a distinct genus in its own right by Davide Foffa and colleagues in 2018, given its differences from P. andrewsi and Liopleurodon ferox. Madzia and colleagues in 2022 noted that the fact that Liopleurodon was named based on a single tooth of dubious distinctiveness is problematic, and that a more complete neotype may need to be designated to preserve the stability of L. ferox. They also stated that further study of the taxon was needed to confirm that the supposed differences between L. ferox and L. pachydeirus were indeed due to individual variation.

Description

Estimating the size of pliosaurs is difficult because not much is known of their postcranial anatomy. Additional Kronosaurus specimens and a skeleton of L. ferox, GPIT 1754/2, show that their skulls were actually about one-fifth of their total body length.

Classification 
 
 
Liopleurodon belongs to clade Thalassophonea, a short necked clade within the Pliosauridae, a family of plesiosaurs, thalassophoneans ranged from the Middle Jurassic to early Late Cretaceous, and have been found worldwide.

Liopleurodon was one of the basal taxa from the Middle Jurassic. Differences between these taxa and their relatives from the Upper Jurassic include alveoli count, smaller skull and smaller body size.

An analysis in 2013 classifies Liopleurodon, Simolestes, Peloneustes, Pliosaurus, Gallardosaurus, and Brachaucheninae as Thalassophonea.

The cladogram below follows a 2011 analysis by paleontologists Hilary F. Ketchum and Roger B. J. Benson, and reduced to genera only.

Palaeobiology

Four strong paddle-like limbs suggest that Liopleurodon was a powerful swimmer. Its four-flipper mode of propulsion is characteristic of all plesiosaurs. A study involving a swimming robot has demonstrated that although this form of propulsion is not especially efficient, it provides very good acceleration—a desirable trait in an ambush predator. Studies of the skull have shown that it could probably scan the water with its nostrils to ascertain the source of certain smells.

A fragmentary specimen possibly belonging to a young adult individual, PETCM R.296, contained numerous hooklets of teuthoid cephalopods, fish bones and a single reptilian tooth in its stomach. Although its exact dietary preference cannot be determined, Martill proposed three suggestions. One possibility is that Liopleurodon could have fed on food supplies that are abundant (i.e. squids), but considering that plesiosaurs and ichthyosaurs were also abundant and that the plesiosaurs' swimming speed is likely very slow compared to squids, this interpretation may be unlikely unless Liopleurodon was an ambush predator. Another possibility is that Liopleurodon may have been an opportunistic feeder, with cephalopod hooklets being representative of the acid resistant residue of its varied diet—skeletal components of various vertebrates that lost to the acid environment of the gut; however, since the thin sections through the gut don't reveal the presence of otoliths (calcium carbonate structure of vertebrates located in the vestibular labyrinth) which are known to occur in the gut of cetaceans, fish may not have been an important part of its diet. The other possibility is that the pliosaur fed on large cephalopod-feeders, with the hooklets representing the residues of the stomach contents of the pliosaur's prey, but there is no firm evidence to this claim. It is also notable that this specimen preserved at least 7 gastroliths, which probably weren't used for grinding based on the well-preserved conditions of the hooklets. It is possible either that the pliosaur accidentally swallowed the stones and they remained in its gut, or that the stones represent the "acid resistant residue from carbonate cemented sandstone."

See also

 List of plesiosaur genera
 Timeline of plesiosaur research

Notes

References

External links

 Liopleurodon information and photos, The Plesiosaur Directory
 Article on the giant pliosaur skull once assigned to Liopleurodon, Tetrapod Zoology

Pliosaurids
Middle Jurassic plesiosaurs of Europe
Late Jurassic plesiosaurs of Europe
Fossil taxa described in 1873
Taxa named by Henri Émile Sauvage
Oxford Clay
Sauropterygian genera